Verkhnekolymsky District (Üöhee Xalıma uluuha) is an administrative and municipal district (raion, or ulus), one of the thirty-four in the Sakha Republic, Russia. It is located in the northeast of the republic and borders with Srednekolymsky District in the north and northeast, Srednekansky District and Susumansky District of Magadan Oblast in the east and south, Momsky District in the west, and with Abyysky District in the northwest. Its administrative center is the urban locality (a settlement) of Zyryanka. Population:  5,653 (2002 Census);  The population of Zyryanka accounts for 67.1% of the district's total population.

Geography 
The main rivers of the district are the Kolyma River and its tributaries. Most of the territory of the district is part of the Kolyma lowland.

Climate

History
The district was established on April 30, 1954.

Demographics
As of the 1989 Census, the ethnic composition was as follows:
Russians: 62.1%
Yakuts: 18.3%
Evens: 1.9%
Yukaghir people: 1.8%
Evenks: 0.1%
other ethnicities: 15.8%

Inhabited localities

Divisional source:

*Administrative centers are shown in bold

References

Notes

Sources

Districts of the Sakha Republic